Fokino may refer to:
Fokino Urban Okrug, name of several urban okrugs in Russia
Fokino (inhabited locality), name of several inhabited localities in Russia